The Cupra UrbanRebel is an electric concept car produced by the Spanish manufacturer Cupra. It was officially unveiled on 1 September 2021 at the International Motor Show Germany. Designed and developed in Barcelona, the CUPRA UrbanRebel will be launched in 2025; production is planned in Martorell.

Technical characteristics 
The UrbanRebel is based on the MEB Platform, which is designed for electric vehicles of the Volkswagen Group. The concept car has a rear diffuser integrating the shield, and a huge rectangular spoiler which incorporates the light signature in its lower part with an LED strip including the Cupra logo illuminated in the center.

The UrbanRebel is fitted with a continuous 250 kW (340 hp) electric motor, with a boost function to 320 kW (435 hp).

References

UrbanRebel
Electric concept cars